Benubana Chhaya is a categorized water park in Kolkata located at EM Bypass, Baishnabghata Patuli Township. It has been developed by Kolkata Metropolitan Development Authority (KMDA) in 2013 for beatification of Kolkata. It is a Public Park built around a lake and has a tree lined path flanked by lakes on either side. The park is a peaceful destination to spend time with family and friends. Visitors can also take a boat ride, and visit a tram restaurant located inside the park. One needs to buy a ticket to enter the park and the price for the ticket is Rs10 per person.

References

Parks in Kolkata
Urban public parks